Elke Sleurs (born 6 February 1968, in Ghent) is a Belgian politician and is affiliated to the N-VA.

Sleurs is a gynaecologist. She was elected as a member of the Belgian Senate in 2010. After the 2014 elections Sleurs was elected as a member of the Flemish Parliament and a regional senator. However, in October 2014, she became Secretary of State for Poverty Reduction, Equal Opportunities, People With Disabilities, Combating Fraud and Scientific Policy in the Michel Government. On 21 May 2015, she became secretary of state for Urban Policy, but handed over the Combating Fraud portfolio to colleague Johan Van Overtveldt.

On February 20, 2017, Sleurs announced she would leave her position as Secretary of State for Equal Rights, Disabled Persons, Scientific Policy, Urban Policy and fighting Poverty to become lijsttrekker in Ghent for the upcoming 2018 municipal elections. Three days later, the N-VA decided to replace Sleurs with Zuhal Demir. Demir was sworn in by the King on 24 February 2017.

Notes

Living people
Members of the Senate (Belgium)
New Flemish Alliance politicians
1968 births
Politicians from Ghent
Belgian women physicians
Women gynaecologists
21st-century Belgian politicians
21st-century Belgian women politicians
Belgian obstetricians and gynaecologists